The White Rose Pothole Club (WRPC) are a Caving Club founded in May 1954 and based in the Yorkshire Dales.

History 

In August 1953, a groups of friends working at Southern and Redfern Ltd, Refrigeration Engineers, Bradford created the Southern & Redfern Caving Club. The club used of one of the firm's lift trucks for transport. Management of the club was limited to employees of the firm. By May 1954, the membership was being drawn from further afield and a decision was made to form an independent club. The White Rose Pothole Club was chosen as the name. The club held its first meeting on Sunday 2 May 1954 at Calf Holes Pot, Birkwith, Browgill, Old Ing and Dismal Hill Caves.

Exploration: Digs, Discoveries And Extensions (1954-1994) 

(1994) Jed Pot - Discovery
(1993) Outdate Pot - Reopening & Extension
(1993) Middlesmoor Flood Rising - Dig
(1993) High Dyke Hole - Discovery
(1993) Gem Cave - Discovery
(1992) Rain Pot - Dig
(1992) Hagg Gill Pot, Scaling Boulder Choke Aven (with CPC)
(1991) Providence Pot, Upstream Sump Dig
(1991) Howgill Nick - Dig (with CPC) 
(1990) Milligan Pot - Discovery
(1990) Hagg Gill Pot, Showerbath Inlet Dig
(1990) Goon Pot - Dig
(1990) Compass Pot - Discovery
(1989) Plantation Pot - Extension
(1989 Hole-In-The-Wall - Discovery
(1989) Hagg Gill Pot, Mayday Series Extension (with CPC)
(1989) Hagg Beck Active Sink - Extension
(1988) Hagg Gill Pot - Discovery
(1988) Deepdale Rising - Removal of First Sump
(1987) Ireby Fell 2, Bolting Jupiter Aven
(1987) Chapel Lodge Cave - Extension
(1984) Tweedle Pot - Dig
(1980) Pippikin Pot, Climbing Andromeda Aven
(1979) Upper Heselden Cave 2 - Extension (with NCC)
(1979) Spar Pot - Discovery
(1979) Pippikin Pot, Crumbles Dig
(1979) Cherry Tree Hole, Scaling Spiral Chamber
(1978) Bracken Cave - Discovery
(1977) Oddmire Pot - Discovery
(1977) Little Fell Pot - Discovery
(1977) Bean Pot - Reopening
(1975) Thornton Viaduct Pot - Extension
(1974) Cote Gill Pot - Reopening & Extension
(1973) Howden Lodge Sinks - Discovery
(1969) Ravens Nest Cave - Discovery
(1969) Disappointment Pot - Extension
(1969) Churn Milk Hole - Dig
(1968) Ringle Mill Cave - Extension
(1968) Greenest Cave - Extension
(1968) Froskegrotten (Norway) - Discovery
(1968) Fawcett Moor Cave - Discovery
(1968) Basmogrotten (Norway) - Discovery
(1967) Rumbling Shake - Discovery
(1967) Nick Pot - Extension
(1967) New Year Cave - Discovery
(1967) Firth Wood Cave - Discovery
(1966) Shaking Moss Pot - Discovery (with CPC)
(1966) River Pot - Discovery
(1966) Hidden Valley Cave - Discovery (with CPC)
(1966) Amalgamation Pot - Discovery (with CPC)
(1966) Crystal Beck Pot - Discovery
(1964) Spike Pot - Discovery
(1964) Lower Cullan Zero (Doolin) - Discovery
(1962) One Way Cave - Discovery
(1961) WRPC 3 - Discovery
(1961) Cow Close Cave - Discovery
(1960) Scald Bank Cave - Discovery
(1960) Ling Gill Pot - Discovery
(1960) Knowe Fell - Dig
(1960) Gill Ring Cave No. 2 & 3 - Discovery
(1960) Gill Rigg Cave No. 4 - Discovery
(1960) Gill Rigg Cave No. 1 - Discovery
(1960) Cross Pot - Dig
(1960) Coppy Gill North - Discovery
(1960) Scald Bank Cave - Discovery
(1959) Peevish Pot - Discovery
(1959) Lower Scar Hill Cave East - Discovery
(1956) Sikes Cave - Discovery
(1956) Scar Hill Cave - Extension
(1956) Lower Scar Hill Cave - Discovery
(1956) Lower Ling Gill Cave - Discovery
(1955) Coppy Gill Cave - Discovery
(1954) Cross Keys Hole - Discovery

See also 

 Caving in the United Kingdom

References

Further reading 

 The White Rose Pothole Club, 1954-2004: 50 Years of Caving and Potholing in the Yorkshire Dales (2004)

External links 

 White Rose Pothole Club Website

Caving organisations in the United Kingdom